The Southern Illinois Salukis men's basketball team represents Southern Illinois University Carbondale in Carbondale, Illinois. The Salukis compete in the NCAA Division 1, and they play their home games at Banterra Center. As of March 2019, Saluki Hall of Fame basketball player, Bryan Mullins, has become the newest head coach of the Southern Illinois basketball program.

History
Prior to joining the NCAA, the Salukis competed in the NAIA men's basketball. Appearing five times, with a combined tournament record of 9 wins and 4 losses. Most notable tournament appearances came in 1945, in which the Salukis finished third, and then the following year in the 1946 tournament where the Salukis were NAIA national champions. The Salukis would not place again in the following three tournament appearances in 1947, 1948, 1960.

In 1967, SIU, led by guard Walt Frazier, who went on to be named one of the 50 Greatest Players in NBA History, won the National Invitation Tournament under coach Jack Hartman. At the time, the tournament was considered much more prestigious than it is today. The Salukis were members of the College Division (now Division II) and were therefore ineligible to compete for the NCAA Division I Tournament.

In 1977, future NBA player Mike Glenn led the Salukis to the NCAA Division I Tournament Sweet Sixteen.

From 1993 to 1995, SIU advanced to three straight NCAA Division I Tournaments. Prior to that, the Salukis participated in the National Invitation Tournament for four consecutive years from 1989 to 1992.

Part of the SIU Saluki men's basketball team's 2003 season was chronicled in MTV's True Life: I Am A College Baller.

The Saluki men's basketball team garnered national attention by advancing to the Sweet Sixteen in 2002 and 2007.

In the 2006–2007 season, the Salukis, coached by Chris Lowery, reached their highest ranking in the AP Coaches Poll and the ESPN/USA Today Poll with a position of #11, before dropping to #14 after losing the MVC to Creighton prior to entering the NCAA tournament.

After achieving success at SIU, former coaches Bruce Weber and Matt Painter accepted head coaching positions at schools in the Big Ten. Weber took over at Illinois in 2003 and Painter – an alumnus of and former basketball player at Purdue University – accepted the Boilermakers' offer to become top assistant and designated successor to Gene Keady in 2004, becoming head coach in March 2006.

Prior to the 2018-2019 season, the Salukis became the first NCAA men's basketball team to win a completed game against the Cuban national team during a pre-season visit to the country.

Nine Salukis have gone on to play in the NBA:

Chico Vaughn - St. Louis Hawks (1963–66), Detroit Pistons (1966-67)
Walt Frazier - New York Knicks (1968–77), Cleveland Cavaliers (1978–80)
Dick Garrett - Los Angeles Lakers (1970), Buffalo Braves (1971-73), New York Knicks (1974), Milwaukee Bucks (1974)
Nate Hawthorne - Los Angeles Lakers (1974), Phoenix Suns (1975–76)
Joe C. Meriweather - Houston Rockets (1976), Atlanta Hawks (1977), New Orleans Jazz (1978–79), Kansas City Kings (1981–85)
Mike Glenn - Buffalo Braves (1978), New York Knicks (1979-81), Atlanta Hawks (1982–85), Milwaukee Bucks (1986-87)
Ashraf Amaya - Vancouver Grizzlies (1996), Washington Bullets (1997)
Chris Carr - Phoenix Suns (1996), Minnesota Timberwolves (1997–98), New Jersey Nets (1999), Golden State Warriors (2000), Chicago Bulls (2000), Boston Celtics (2001)
Troy Hudson - Utah Jazz (1998), Los Angeles Clippers (1999-2000), Orlando Magic (2001-02), Minnesota Timberwolves (2003–07), Golden State Warriors (2007–08)

Yearly records (Division I)

Postseason results

NCAA Division I tournament results
The Salukis have appeared in the NCAA Division I Tournament ten times. Their combined record is 6–10.

NCAA Division II tournament results
The Salukis have appeared in the NCAA Division II Tournament seven times. Their combined record is 17–9.

NAIA tournament results
The Salukis have appeared in five NAIA Division I Tournaments. Their combined record is 9–4. They were NAIA national champions in 1946.

NIT results
The Salukis have appeared in the National Invitation Tournament (NIT) nine times. Their combined record is 8–8. They were NIT champions in 1967.

Retired numbers

Two players have had their numbers retired by the school.

References

External links